Athletic Club Chalkis, also known as A.C. Chalkida, is an association football club based in Chalkida, Greece. The club was founded in 1967 upon the merger of Olympiakos Chalkida and Evrypos Chalkida. Its colours are black and blue and its symbol is the nymph Arethusa.

Their greatest honour was winning the Beta Ethniki in 1968 and playing in the 1968–69 Alpha Ethniki. They currently play in the Group 3 of Gamma Ethniki.

History

Before the merger 
A.C. Chalkis was founded in 1967 after a merger between the biggest clubs in the city, Olympiakos Chalkida and Evrypos, who were both competing in the Greek Second Division at the time, with Olympiakos finishing 4th and Evrypos 9th.

Due to a law by the regime of the Colonels which ruled Greece since April 1967, athletic clubs that were based in the same city were forced to merge with each other. As a result, Olympiakos Chalkida and Evrypos were merged in summer 1967 and the resulting club was named A.C. Chalkis in order to represent the city of Chalkis as a whole.

A.C. Chalkis 
In the following 1967–68 season and first one after the merger, Chalkida finished 1st in Beta Ethniki's Northern Group and was promoted to the Alpha Ethniki for the first time. However, they were immediately relegated after one season, as they finished 17th in the 1968–69 Alpha Ethniki, second last only to AEL Limassol.

Until 1989 the team competed in the Beta and Gamma Ethniki championships, without repeating the success of their first season, although they won 2 Gamma Ethniki championships in 1977 and 1987. From 1989 to 1996 the team was competing in the lower Gamma and Delta Ethniki championships, and from 1996 to 2003 only in the Delta Ethniki.

Decline 
In 2003 A.C. Chalkis returned to the national championships after seven years, participating in the 2003–04 season of Gamma Ethniki and finishing 11th. Although having finished in a safe mid-table position, the team was in a financial turmoil; the entire squad was released  and negotiations with potential investors were unsuccessful. After a planned merger with local club Doxa Prokopiou was not implemented, Chalkida decided to pull out of every championship, remain inactive for a year and re-appear at the local Evia Football Club Association leagues for the 2005–06 season.

A.C. Chalkis finished 1st in the A1 Division of Evia and was promoted to the Delta Ethniki in 2010. The club also won the Evia Amateur Cup six times and finished as runners-up once, with their last victory being in 2012.

Achievements 
Beta Ethniki
Winners (1): 1967–68
Gamma Ethniki
Winners (1): 1986–87
Delta Ethniki
Winners (3): 1991–92, 1993–94, 2002–03
Evia FCA Championship
Winners (4): 1976–77, 2009–10, 2014–15, 2021–22
Evia FCB Championship
Winners (1): 2007-08
Evia FCA Cup
Winners (7): 1994, 1997, 1998, 1999, 2011, 2012, 2018
Runners-up (1): 2000

League and cup history

Cup results history

Greek Cup

1967-68:
A.C. Chalkis 2-1 Trikala [Round of 32]
Panathinaikos 2-1 A.C. Chalkis [Round of 16]
1970-71:
A.C. Chalkis 1-1 Edessaikos (3-1 pen.) [Preliminary Round]
A.C. Chalkis 1-0 Aigaleo [Round of 32]
Olympiacos 4-0 A.C. Chalkis [Round of 16]
1972-73:
A.C. Chalkis 0-1 Levadiakos [Round of 64]
1973-74: 
A.C. Chalkis 1-0 Veroia (Berroea) [Round of 64]
Lamia 1-1 A.C. Chalkis (1-4 pen.) [Round of 32]
PAS Giannena 2-1 A.C. Chalkis [Round of 16]
1974-75:
A.C. Chalkis 0-1 Panaitolikos [First Round]
1975-76:
A.C. Chalkis 1-0 Corinth [First Round]
No match (second round)
A.C. Chalkis 1-2 Panionios [Round of 16]
1977-78:
Panthrakikos 4-2 A.C. Chalkis [Round of 64]
1978-79:
A.C. Chalkis 2-0 Lamia [Round of 64]
Karditsa 1-0 (aet) A.C. Chalkis [Round of 32]
1980-81:
A.C. Chalkis 1-3 Olympiacos [Round of 64]
1981-82:
A.C. Chalkis 2-1 Trikkala [Round of 64]
Toxotis Volos 2-1 (aet) A.C. Chalkis [Round of 32]
1982-83:
Kastoria 7-4 A.C. Chalkis [Round of 64]
1983-84:
A.C. Chalkis 0-2 OFI [Round of 64]
1984-85:
Aris F.C.|Aris 9-0 A.C. Chalkis [Round of 64]

1985-86:
A.C. Chalkis 6-1 Neapoli Piraeus [Round of 64]
A.C. Chalkis - Iraklis Kavala (1-0, 0-1 pen. 3–0) [Round of 32]
A.C. Chalkis - AEK (1-2, 0–2) [Round of 16]
1986-87:
Olympiakos Chalkida 2-1 A.C. Chalkis [Round of 64]
1987-88:
Panathinaikos 2-0 A.C. Chalkis [Round of 64]
1988-89:
Group 14
Aris 4
Anagennisi Arta 2
A.C. Chalkis 0
1992-93:
Group 2
Panachaiki 7
Olympiakos Volos 7
EAR 3
A.C. Chalkis 2
Pontioi Kozani 1
1994-95:
Group 4
Ethnikos 6
A.C. Chalkis 5
Panaitolikos 5
Athenaicos 5
Niki Volos 4
1995-96:
Group 4
Agios Nikolaos 10
Anagennisi Giannitsa 8
Ethnikos 7
A.C. Chalkis 3
Doxa Drama 0
2003-04:
Kalamata - A.C. Chalkis (2-1, 1–0) [Round of 64]

Evia Cup

1993-94: A.C. Chalkis 3-2 Tamynaikos  (1-1 aet)
1996-97: A.C. Chalkis 2-0 Tamynaikos 
1997-98: A.C. Chalkis 3-1 A.E.K. Chalkida
1998-99: A.C. Chalkis 2-1 Doxa Prokopi
1999-00: Lilas Vassiliko 1-0 A.C. Chalkis
2010-11: A.C. Chalkis 2-0 APKO Drosia
2011-12: A.C. Chalkis 1-0 Loukissi
2012-13: A.C. Chalkis 2-0 Pantriadikos (0-0 aet)

Players

Current squad

References

External links 
Evia Football Clubs Association

Gamma Ethniki clubs
Football clubs in Central Greece
Association football clubs established in 1967
1967 establishments in Greece
Sports clubs in Euboea
Chalcis